IPEX may refer to:

 Immunodysregulation polyendocrinopathy enteropathy X-linked syndrome, a rare disease linked to the dysfunction of the transcriptional activator FoxP3,
 Italian Power Exchange
 Interparliamentary EU Information Exchange
 IPEX (trade show), the largest printing and graphic arts trade show in the English-speaking world
 Ipex (company), a Swedish pharmaceuticals company
 miniature RF connector for high-frequency signals, also called Hirose U.FL